Katyusha Continental Team was a Russian UCI Continental cycling team.

Major wins
2008
Overall Five Rings of Moscow, Denis Galimzyanov
Memorial Oleg Dyachenko, Timofey Kritskiy
Overall Boucle de l'Artois, Timofey Kritskiy
Mayor Cup, Timofey Kritskiy
Overall Grand Prix Guillaume Tell, Timofey Kritskiy
2009
Overall Five Rings of Moscow, Timofey Kritskiy
Memorial Oleg Dyachenko, Mikhail Antonov 
Mayor Cup, Mikhail Antonov
La Côte Picarde, Timofey Kritskiy
Overall Tour du Loir-et-Cher, Dmitriy Kosyakov

References

Defunct cycling teams based in Russia
Cycling teams established in 2008
Cycling teams disestablished in 2010
UCI Continental Teams (Europe)
2008 establishments in Russia
2010 disestablishments in Russia